George Hay Dawkins-Pennant (20 February 1764 – 17 December 1840), of Penrhyn Castle, Caernarvonshire, and 56 Portland Place, Middlesex, was a plantation and slave owner, Member of Parliament for Newark and New Romney.

He was the second son of Henry Dawkins and his original name was George Hay Dawkins; the surname Pennant was added when he inherited the estate from his second cousin Richard Pennant, 1st Baron Penrhyn, who died in 1808.

Life
Dawkins-Pennant was a Member of Parliament (MP) for Newark 19 May 1814 to 1818; and for New Romney 1820 to 1830.

Dawkins-Pennant inherited four large sugar estates (Cotes, Denbigh, Kupuis, Pennant's) in Clarendon Parish, Jamaica, and at the time of emancipation in the 1830s, the British government compensated him for over 650 slaves in his possession. Best known for his development of the Penrhyn estates, he died immensely wealthy, leaving £600,000.

Family
Dawkins-Pennant married in 1807 Sophia Mary Maude (d. 1812), daughter of Cornwallis Maude, 1st Viscount Hawarden. They had two children Juliana Isabella Mary (1808–1842) and Emma Elizabeth Isabella (1810–1888). In 1814 he married Elizabeth, daughter of William Henry Bouverie.

His eldest daughter and co-heiress Juliana Isabella Mary Dawkins-Pennant married Colonel Edward Gordon Douglas in August 1833, from 1841 Edward Douglas-Pennant, 1st Baron Penrhyn of the second creation. They had two children, of which eldest son George Sholto Gordon Douglas-Pennant succeeded his father in 1886 as the 2nd Baron Penrhyn.

Emma Elizabeth Isabella Dawkins-Pennant married in 1831 Thomas-Charles, Hanbury-Tracy, 2nd Baron Sudeley (d. 1863). He left £140,000. She had children with him and his successor, also Lord Sudeley.

References

1764 births
1840 deaths
UK MPs 1812–1818
UK MPs 1820–1826
UK MPs 1826–1830
People from Bangor, Gwynedd
Members of the Parliament of the United Kingdom for English constituencies
People from the City of Westminster
British slave owners